Akyazı is a quarter of the town Yapraklı, Yapraklı District, Çankırı Province, Turkey. Its population is 239 (2021).

References

Populated places in Yapraklı District